An Order of Justice is one of three types of originating process used in the Royal Court of the Island of Jersey (part of the British Isles).  It is a combination of the originating process (in England & Wales, for example a "writ") and a statement of claim.  Other types of originating process are the [simple] Summons and the Representation.

Jersey law